The A1 motorway is a motorway in North Macedonia forming part of the E75. It spans  as a four-lane, tolled, controlled-access highway. It crosses the country from north to south, starting at the border with Serbia near Kumanovo and ending at the Evzoni-Bogorodica border crossing with Greece near Gevgelija. As a part of the Pan-European corridor X (along with the E70), connecting to North Macedonia's biggest cities, it is one of the vital highways for Macedonian infrastructure, and significant works are currently undergoing for its reconstruction and enhancement.

Route
The motorway begins right after the North Macedonia–Serbia border checkpoint and it continues as a first class motorway for approximately 40 km, when it reaches the Skopje Airport and the interchange with the A2. Nevertheless, in the  part between Skopje Airport and Veles, the motorway splits, creating a gradual distance of several kilometers. The northbound route is the postulated motorway route whilst the slightly longer southbound route, with dangerous bends, is the old road and is being used as a freeway as it is only one-way. Currently, enhancement works are undertaken in this part. Also, the  Smokvica–Demir Kapija section was finished in 2018, thus providing a highway between the Serbian and Greek borders.

Pictures

References

Motorways in North Macedonia